KSAT may refer to:

 Kongsberg Satellite Services
 Krueger School of Applied Technologies, a magnet program of the Krueger Middle School, San Antonio, Texas, United States
 KSAT (satellite), developed by Kagoshima University, Japan
 KSAT-TV, a television station (channel 12, virtual 12) licensed to San Antonio, Texas, United States
 San Antonio International Airport, Texas, United States (by ICAO airport code)
 Ksat, shorthand for saturated hydraulic conductivity
Korean SAT Test, College Scholastic Ability Test